Tondiraba (Estonian for "Ghost Bog", although etymologically unrelated) is a subdistrict in the district of Lasnamäe, Tallinn, the capital of Estonia. , there are no residents living in the subdistrict.

See also
Tallinn Arena

References

Subdistricts of Tallinn